Yirrkala kaupii is an eel in the family Ophichthidae (worm/snake eels). It was described by Pieter Bleeker in 1858, originally under the genus Sphagebranchus. It is a tropical, freshwater eel which is known from Indonesia and the Philippines.

References

Ophichthidae
Fish described in 1858